Khargana is a rural locality (an ulus) in Kurumkansky District, Republic of Buryatia, Russia. The population was 60 as of 2010.

References 

Rural localities in Kurumkansky District